Yarovoye is a town in Altai Krai, Russia, located on the north shore of Lake Bolshoye Yarovoye,  west of Barnaul, the administrative center of the krai. Population:

History
It was established in 1943 and was granted town status in 1993.

Administrative and municipal status
Within the framework of administrative divisions, it is incorporated as the town of krai significance of Yarovoye—an administrative unit with the status equal to that of the districts. As a municipal division, the town of krai significance of Yarovoye is incorporated as Yarovoye Urban Okrug.

Social status
Yarovoye is a popular resort that take around 2 million people in one season(June-August). City gained popularity in a long ago, in 80-s, even before "Prichal" came to build the tourist infrastructure. The Salt Lake "Big Yarovoye" is the main benefit of the city. Tourists coming to get a healthy air, float on top of the water and get a healing black dirt, that lies underground of the lake.

References

Notes

Sources

Cities and towns in Altai Krai
Populated places established in 1943